Limpopo was a gunboat built for the Portuguese Navy in England in 1890. It was in service in Ajuda, São Tomé, and Cape Verde. In 1904, the boat was used in a battle against a Russian squadron in Tigres Bay. For a time it was commanded by famous Portuguese geographer Carlos Viegas Gago Coutinho.

It was taken out of active use in 1939 and decommissioned in 1943.

References

Ships of the Portuguese Navy
1890 ships